Bethany Brookshire is an American science journalist. She writes for Science News for Students.

Education 
Brookshire completed a BA (Philosophy) and BS (Biology) at the College of William & Mary in 2004. She earned a PhD in Physiology and Pharmacology at Wake Forest School of Medicine in 2010, where she worked on ritalin and the serotonin switch with Sara Jones. She began blogging about science in 2008, during her graduate studies. She wrote under the pseudonym "SciCurious" for Discover and The Guardian. She worked as a postdoctoral researcher at the University of Pennsylvania, where she used social media to discuss the brain and psychiatric illness. Here she worked with Irwin Lucki identifying the mechanisms of antidepressants in action.

Career 
In 2013, Brookshire began blogging in her own name. Today she writes Eureka!Lab for Science News for Students, and for SciCurious for Science News. She presents the podcast Science for the People, as well as appearing on other science related shows. She appeared on the Story Collider in 2015, a show which tells the stories of scientists, where Brookshire discussed her quest for a mentor. In May 2016 she published Science Blogging: The Essential Guide with Christie Wilcox and Jason Goldman.

She has written for Slate, Scientific American,  and The Open Notebook.

Her most recent book, Pests: How Humans Create Animal Villains, was published in December 2022 by Ecco. It focuses on the topic of human-animal interactions.

Awards 
2009 – Synapse Award from Wake Forest School of Medicine
2009 – PLoS ONE Blog Pick of the Month for December
2012 – Society for Neuroscience Next Generation Award
2011 – 3 Quarks Daily Science Writing Award
2014 – Sloan Foundation Writing Grant
2016 – Woods Hole Marine Biological Laboratory Logan Science Journalism Fellow
2019 – Knight Science Journalism Fellowship

References 

Women science writers
American science writers
College of William & Mary alumni
Wake Forest School of Medicine alumni
American science journalists
Science communicators
American women journalists
21st-century American journalists
21st-century American women writers